Coca-Cola Bottling Company United, Inc. is a private Coca-Cola bottling company headquartered in Birmingham, Alabama, US. Coca-Cola United is the largest privately held Coca-Cola bottler in the United States and the second largest in which the Coca-Cola Company does not own an interest.

Coca-Cola United is a direct store delivery bottler. Finished product is delivered to customers within a geographic area. Therefore, they are considered the brand's local Coca-Cola bottler distributors.

History
Coca-Cola Bottling Company United, Inc., founded in 1902 and headquartered in Birmingham, Alabama, is the third-largest bottler of Coca-Cola products in the United States and the largest privately held Coca-Cola bottler employing more than 10,000 employees. Coca-Cola United is principally engaged in the production, marketing, and distribution of over 750 non-alcoholic beverages, which include over 200 no or low-calorie options. Starting in 2013 United has acquired several territories across the SouthEast region, including the Savanna River Division and the Atlanta Division. The Atlanta Division covers The Coca-Cola Company's headquarter in Atlanta.

Among the brands are Coca-Cola, Coke Zero, Diet Coke, Sprite, Dr Pepper, Fanta, Dasani, Powerade, Minute Maid, vitaminwater and many more under exclusive franchise agreements with the Coca-Cola Company and other soft drink manufacturers.

References

Coca-Cola bottlers
Companies based in Birmingham, Alabama
Privately held companies based in Alabama
Privately held companies of the United States
American companies established in 1902
Food and drink companies established in 1902
Drink companies of the United States